Gordon Chree (born 1978) is a Scottish reporter for STV News  and occasional relief anchor on the East edition of STV News at Six, and the online video blog Not The Real MacKay.
Chree was one of the live reporters at the Glasgow Airport attack for STV, ITV News, and CNN. 
Prior to STV, Chree worked for several commercial radio stations, including the now-defunct Edinburgh station Talk 107.

References

External links

1978 births
Living people
People educated at Grove Academy 
STV News newsreaders and journalists